IGAC may stand for:
International Global Atmospheric Chemistry
Inspecção Geral das Actividades Culturais
Investors Group Athletic Centre in Winnipeg, Manitoba, Canada